The 1993–94 National Football League, known for sponsorship reasons as the Church & General National Football League, was the 63rd staging of the National Football League (NFL), an annual Gaelic football tournament for the Gaelic Athletic Association county teams of Ireland.

Meath defeated Armagh in the final.

Format 
The 1993/94 format of the National Football League was a system of four divisions of eight teams. Each team played every other team in its division once, either home or away. 2 points were awarded for a win and 1 for a draw.

The top two teams in divisions 2, 3 and 4 were promoted, while the bottom two teams in divisions 1, 2 and 3 were relegated.

Eight teams contested the NFL quarter-finals:
The top four teams in Division 1
The top two teams in Division 2
The winners of Division 3
The winners of Division 4

League Phase

Division One

Play-Offs

Table

Division Two

Table

Division Three

Play-Offs

Table

Division Four

Play-Offs

Table

Knockout phase

Quarter-finals

Semi-finals

Final

References

External links

National Football League
National Football League
National Football League (Ireland) seasons